Eagles and Angels is a 2001 novel by the German writer Juli Zeh.

Reception
Josh Lacey wrote in The Guardian: "Zeh's style is always enjoyable. She writes brittle little sentences, trying to shock and often succeeding. Her characters are vivacious and thrilling; she tussles with big themes, and is fuelled by an admirable fury. But the novel doesn't quite work - the plot has many inconsistencies, the characters aren't entirely credible, the narrative voice strives too hard for effect."

See also
 2001 in literature
 German literature

References

External links
 Eagles and Angels at the publisher's website

2001 German novels
German-language novels
Novels by Juli Zeh